Georgi Traykov Girovski, also known as Georgi Traykov (14 April 1898, Varbeni, Manastir Vilayet, Ottoman Empire (today Itea, Greece) – 14 January 1975, Sofia, Bulgaria), was a Bulgarian politician and the longtime leader of Bulgarian Agrarian National Union. Traykov became leader of the Agrarian Union in December 1947, a year after the Bulgarian Communist Party rise to power. He quickly dismissed officials not affiliated with the Bulgarian Communist Party, helping to make the party a loyal partner of the Communists.

On 23 April 1964 he became the nominal head of state and Chairman of the Presidium of the National Assembly of Bulgaria, following the death of Dimitar Ganev. He remained head of state until 7 July 1971, when the leader of the communist party, Todor Zhivkov, took that position as the Chairman of the State Council. Nearly a year later, In April 1972, Traykov also gave up his position as chairman of the national assembly. In July 1972 Traykov was appointed as First Deputy Chairman of the State Council and held this post until November 1974.

Traykov won a Lenin Peace Prize in 1962. Traykov died on 14 January 1975, aged 76.

References

1898 births
1975 deaths
Chairpersons of the National Assembly of Bulgaria
People from Manastir vilayet
Bulgarians from Aegean Macedonia
Bulgarian Agrarian National Union politicians
Members of the National Assembly (Bulgaria)
Government ministers of Bulgaria
Deputy prime ministers of Bulgaria
Presidents of Bulgaria
Macedonian Bulgarians
Heroes of the People's Republic of Bulgaria
Lenin Peace Prize recipients
20th-century Bulgarian politicians
People from Meliti (municipal unit)